Steve Buscemi is an American actor who first gained notice for his role as a man living with AIDS in the film Parting Glances (1986). His breakout role in film was in his role as Mr. Pink in Quentin Tarantino's Reservoir Dogs (1992). Since then, Buscemi has starred in dozens of feature films, including Pulp Fiction (1994), Desperado (1995), Con Air (1997), Armageddon (1998), Monsters, Inc. (2001), Spy Kids 2: The Island of Lost Dreams (2002), Spy Kids 3-D: Game Over (2003), Fargo (1996), Igor (2008), Grown Ups (2010), Hotel Transylvania (2012), Monsters University (2013), The Ridiculous 6 (2015), and The Death of Stalin (2017).

In television, Buscemi has hosted two episodes of Saturday Night Live, and has frequently starred as Tony Blundetto in The Sopranos, Lenny Wosniak in 30 Rock, as the lead role in Boardwalk Empire, and as the host of the web television series, Park Bench with Steve Buscemi.

Film

Television

Actor

Director

Producer

Video games

References

External links 
 
Buscemi, Steve
Buscemi, Steve